Anjahamana is a village and rural municipality in the district of Brickaville Vohibinany (district), Atsinanana Region, Madagascar.

References

Populated places in Atsinanana